Hagnagora marionae is a species of moth of the family Geometridae first described by Gunnar Brehm and J. Bolling Sullivan in 2005. It has been collected only at two high mountain areas in
Costa Rica at elevations above .

The species resembles the other species of the H. anicata clade, but is easily distinguished by large orange-yellow blotches on the forewings.

References

Moths described in 2005
Larentiinae